The 2011 World Judo Open Championships were held at Judo Centre in Tyumen, Russia, 29–30 October, 2011.
The IJF jury accorded the Ippon award to Keiji Suzuki(Japan) and Megumi Tachimoto(Japan), for their spectacular techniques.。

Medal overview

Men's events

Women's events

Medals table

Tournament results

Men's event

Playoff

Women's event

Playoff

Prize money
The sums written are per medalist. Special prizes for "the best technique" for men and women, in the sum of 5,000$, were also awarded.

References

External links
 

W
O
J